Alcmaria Victrix is a Dutch omnisport club based in Alkmaar. The club has football, baseball and softball departments. The name is derived from the city crest "Wapen van Alkmaar", Alcmaria Victrix as in Alkmaar as victor.

History
One of the oldest football clubs in the country, the football club was founded 1 January 1898. In the early years of professional football in the Netherlands, Alcmaria Victrix were a competitive side, having played at the top flight of football in the Netherlands, as well as competing in the KNVB Cup. Currently the football team compete on an amateur level. No longer the top club in Alkmaar, the side was eventually surpassed by Alkmaar '54 who later merged to become AZ Alkmaar.

References

External links
 Alcmaria Victrix - Official website

1898 establishments in the Netherlands
Association football clubs established in 1898
Football clubs in the Netherlands
Football clubs in Alkmaar
Multi-sport clubs in the Netherlands